The 1933 Datsun Type 12 was a small car produced by the Nissan corporation.

Description
The 1933 Datsun Type 12 was a small car produced by the Nissan corporation. The name Datsun was used by DAT for their line of small cars. After the DAT corporation was absorbed into Nissan, these cars continued to be produced, and the original model name was maintained. The Type 12 was basically similar to the earlier 1932 Type 11, but had a larger engine.  

Japanese laws at that time did not require a license to drive automobiles with small-displacement engines. DAT/Nissan produced the Datsun Type 11 as their entry into this market. The original limitation for this class of vehicles was 500 cc displacement engines, but that was changed to 750 cc in 1933. Nissan responded to this change by producing a larger engine, and gave the more powerful car a new name, the Type 12. The Type 12 was superseded by the Datsun Type 13 in July 1934.

References

 Nissan Heritage Collection
 Ken Togo's paper Infant Industry Policy: A Case of Japanese Automobile Industry Before 1945
 Japanese Society of Automotive Engineers (JSAE)
 Christopher Madeley's paper Kaishinsha, DAT, Nissan and the British Motor Vehicle Industry

External links
 

Type 12
Rear-wheel-drive vehicles
Cars introduced in 1933